Noss Head is a headland on the north-west coast of Scotland that overlooks Sinclairs Bay.

Noss Head was first mentioned in the historical record as early as the 2nd century AD by Greek geographer Ptolemaios as Verubium Promontorium.

Noss Head Lighthouse

Noss Head Lighthouse first entered service in 1849, and consists of an  cylindrical tower, which is painted white. It supports a single gallery and a lantern with a black cupola. It is notable as being the first lighthouse that was built with a diagonally paned lantern room. In 1987 the light was converted to automatic operation. The lighthouse is still owned and operated by the Northern Lighthouse Board (NLB).

Marine Protected Area
It is home to the largest bed of horse mussels known in Scottish waters, which lies at a depth of between 35 and 45 m below sea level. Living amongst the mussel beds are many other species, including soft corals, tubeworms, barnacles, sea firs, and sea mats, brittlestars, crabs, worms and molluscs.

The MPA is designated a Category IV protected area by the International Union for Conservation of Nature.

References 

Caithness
Nature Conservation Marine Protected Areas of Scotland
Headlands of Scotland